Moosburg may refer to:
 Moosburg an der Isar, a town in Bavaria, Germany
 Moosburg, Baden-Württemberg, a municipality in Baden-Württemberg, Germany
 Moosburg, Austria, a market town in Carinthia, Austria
 Przedecz, a town in Greater Poland Voivodeship, Poland
 Zalavár, a municipality in Zala County, Hungary
People:
 Berthold of Moosburg (died after 1361), Dominican theologian
Castles:
 Mosburg (Biebrich) in Wiesbaden, Hesse, Germany